Alexandre Aleksandrovich Kirillov (born 1936) is a Soviet and Russian mathematician, known for his works in the fields of representation theory, topological groups and Lie groups. In particular he introduced the orbit method into representation theory. He is an emeritus professor at the University of Pennsylvania.

Career
Kirillov studied at Moscow State University where he was a student of Israel Gelfand. His Ph.D. (kandidat) dissertation Unitary representations of nilpotent Lie groups was published in 1962. He was awarded the degree of Doctor of Science. At the time he was the youngest Doctor of Science in the Soviet Union. He worked at the Moscow State University until 1994 when he became the Francis J. Carey Professor of Mathematics at the University of Pennsylvania.

During his school years, Kirillov was a winner of many mathematics competitions, and he is still an active organizer of Russian mathematical contests.  Kirillov is an author of many popular school-oriented books and articles.

In 2012 he became a fellow of the American Mathematical Society.

Kirillov's son, Alexander Kirillov, Jr., is also a mathematician, working on the representation theory of Lie groups at the State University of New York at Stony Brook.

Publications

 .

References

External links

Home page of Alexandre Kirillov
 
 

Soviet mathematicians
20th-century Russian mathematicians
21st-century Russian mathematicians
Group theorists
Russian emigrants to the United States
1936 births
Living people
Moscow State University alumni
University of Pennsylvania faculty
Mathematicians at the University of Pennsylvania
Fellows of the American Mathematical Society